Glavica is a village situated in Paraćin municipality in Serbia.

References

Populated places in Pomoravlje District